The IBM System/360 Model 195 is a discontinued IBM computer introduced on August 20, 1969. The Model 195 was a reimplementation of the IBM System/360 Model 91 design using monolithic integrated circuits. It offers "an internal processing speed about twice as fast as the Model 85,  the next most powerful System/360". The Model 195 was discontinued on February 9, 1977, the same date as the System/370 Model 195.

About 20 Model 195 systems were produced.

Technical specifications
The basic CPU cycle time is 54 nanoseconds (ns). The system has a high degree of parallelism and can process up to seven operations at a time.
The system can be configured with 1, 2, or 4 MB of magnetic core memory (models 195J, 195K, and 195L) with a cycle time of 756 ns. A 32 KB cache, called a buffer memory in the IBM announcement, is standard. Memory blocks are brought into cache in units of 64 bytes.

The normal operating system for the Model 195 is OS/360 Multiprogramming with a Variable Number of Tasks (MVT).

Legacy
The Model 195 was later updated as the IBM System/370 Model 195 with the new System/370 instructions and the 370 TOD clock and control registers, but without the virtual memory hardware.

References

External links
 IBM System/360 Model 195 Functional Characteristics

Computing platforms
System/360 Model 195